Wild Country is a low budget 2006 British horror film directed by Craig Strachan and starring Martin Compston and Peter Capaldi. It was shot on location in and around Glasgow, Scotland in October–November 2004.

The cast was made up of mostly unknown actors with the exception of Martin Compston and a cameo appearance by Peter Capaldi. The budget of the film was an estimated £1 million.

The film was released in select cinemas in Scotland in February 2006. The film was also screened at film festivals worldwide, including the Cannes Film Festival and the London FrightFest Film Festival.

Plot

The plot of the film revolves around a group of Glasgow teenagers who, while on a hike through the Scottish highlands discover an abandoned baby in the ruins of a castle. As the group attempt to get the baby to safety a mysterious wolf-like beast suddenly appears, lurking in the darkness and begins stalking them, intent on killing the group one by one. They soon realize they must kill the beast before it slaughters them all.

The group eventually realize that the werewolf will be able to easily pick them off if they stay out on the moors, and decide to go back to the castle where they found the baby, and is also the beast's lair. After spending the night there, they create a plan to kill the monster. Kelly Ann lures the monster up a staircase and the boys push a stone down onto it. They then stab it to death with spears.

Another beast enters the castle and kills one of the group. Kelly Ann and her boyfriend Lee are the only survivors and flee back into the countryside. The beast in the castle seems anguished at the death of its partner, and the viewer realizes that the two were mates. It follows the two and kills Lee.

Kelly Ann and the baby eventually make it to the hotel where the group was supposed to meet with their guardian, Father Steve. Kelly Ann takes the baby into a bedroom to breastfeed him. The monster appears and kills the owner of the hotel and chases Father Steve into the bedroom where Kelly Ann is. He finds a mother monster feeding its pup, and it kills him. The viewer realizes that the baby was the werewolves' child and it infected Kelly Ann by biting her while she was breastfeeding it earlier in the film. In the credits, two beasts walk through a field back towards the castle while their offspring runs around them.

Cast

 Samantha Shields as Kelly Ann
 Martin Compston as Lee
 Peter Capaldi as Father Steve
 Kevin Quinn as David
 Nicola Muldoon as Louise
 Jamie Quinn as Mark
 Alan Mchugh as Shepherd

References

External links
 
 

2005 films
2005 horror films
British werewolf films
2000s English-language films
2000s British films